Abirami Mega Mall was a shopping mall located in Purasawalkam, Chennai. It was constructed in 2003. Named after its owner Abirami Ramanathan, it was closed in 2019.

Theaters
 Abirami 7 Star Theatre
 Shree Annai Abirami
 Robot Bala Abirami
 Swarna Sakthi Abirami

Filmography
Films
Panchamirtham (2008)
Unnodu Ka (2015)

Television
Abhirami (Kalaignar TV)

See also
Ampa Skywalk
Chennai Citi Centre
Express Avenue
Spencer Plaza

References

External links 
 Official website

Shopping malls established in 2003
Shopping malls disestablished in 2019
Buildings and structures in Chennai
Defunct shopping malls

அபிராமி மெகா மால்